Tuğçe Murat (born July 9, 1991) is a Turkish basketball player for Çankaya Üniversitesi of the Turkish Super League.

Tuğçe Murat was born in 1991 in İstanbul. With the height of 193 cm, Tuğçe plays at the centre position and performed 10 times for Turkey national women's basketball team.

Honors
Turkish Championship
Winners (1): 2007
Turkish Cup
Winners (1): 2007
Turkish Presidents Cup
Winners (1): 2007

See also
 Turkish women in sports

References

External links
Player Profile at fenerbahce.org

1991 births
Living people
Turkish women's basketball players
Centers (basketball)
Sportspeople from İzmir